Money laundering in Canada is a problem described by professionals in 2019 as a "national crisis," and which has attracted international attention. Money laundering has become such a significant part of Canada's domestic economy that anti-money laundering experts have associated two distinct types of laundering (snow washing and the Vancouver Model) with the country. As of July 2022, a public inquiry is currently being held to gauge the extent of the problem.

Economic impact 
Canada generates a significant share of its gross domestic product (GDP) from money laundering. Canadian intelligence estimates $113 billion of funds are laundered annually, which works out to over 5% of GDP. This generates significant demand for goods that may otherwise be considered essential, such as housing.

Housing 
Canadian housing is a frequently used tool for money laundering that often involves organized crime, according to Criminal Intelligence Service Canada, one of the country's intelligence agencies. The problem has become a global phenomenon in countries with high home prices and low levels of scrutiny for home purchases. However, Canada is uniquely targeted due to a lack of beneficial ownership, meaning the true owner of property is never collected by authorities.

Luxury vehicles 
Canada's lack of vehicle purchasing regulations have made luxury passenger vehicles a common tool for money laundering. Luxury vehicles are purchased with illicit cash since payments are only regulated in some provinces, and then sold. The depreciation is a relatively small price to obtain clean money that can be deposited into a bank account with a clear source of funds.

Snow washing 
Snow washing is the process of routing illegal activity through Canada to capitalize on its reputation as a “boring” and safe place.

The Vancouver Model 
The Vancouver Model is the name anti-money laundering experts gave to a unique model observed in Vancouver, Canada. It involves taking illicit cash earned through crime to a casino (often a VIP room), and gambling some of the proceeds.The chips are then cashed out of the casino as clean cash. To further obfuscate the funds in a money laundering process known as layering, the funds are then used to buy assets such as real estate.

Once the real estate is sold at a profit, sometimes to a related party, the funds are considered legitimate (and often tax free) profit. A combination of Canada’s opaque ownership laws and low scrutiny on foreign investment makes it an ideal target.

References 

Canada